Barhan railway station is a junction station on the Kanpur–Delhi section of Howrah–Delhi main line and Howrah–Gaya–Delhi line. It is located just 38 km from Agra City. The station was built by the Britishers and remains essentially unchanged. The railway station is a site in itself and takes one back to pre Independence era.

History 
Through trains started running on the East Indian Railway Company's  Howrah–Delhi line in 1866.

Development 
Etah–Kasganj new line work has been sanctioned in the Budget 2017–2018.

New passenger train service started from – on 10 April 2017.

Barhan–Etah Railway Track Electrification Process Begins

Media

See also 
 Etah railway station
 Tundla Junction railway station
 Agra Fort railway station
 Hathras Junction railway station
 Aligarh Junction railway station

References

External links 

Railway stations in Agra district
Allahabad railway division
Railway stations opened in 1865